Oakland Township is one of sixteen townships in Franklin County, Iowa, United States.  As of the 2010 census, its population was 216 and it contained 121 housing units.

History
Oakland Township was created in 1868.

Geography

Cities, towns, villages
 Popejoy

Unincorporated towns
 Oakland at 
(This list is based on USGS data and may include former settlements.)

Cemeteries
The township contains Oakland Valley Cemetery, Olson Cemetery and Otis Grove Cemetery.

Transportation
 Interstate 35

School districts
 Alden Community School District
 Dows Community School District
 Iowa Falls Community School District

Political districts
 Iowa's 4th congressional district
 State House District 54
 State Senate District 27

References

External links
 City-Data.com

Townships in Iowa
Townships in Franklin County, Iowa
Populated places established in 1868
1868 establishments in Iowa